Stefano Marchetti (born 26 October 1963 in Fontaniva) is an Italian former football striker. Currently is the general director of A.S. Cittadella in Serie B.

Career 
After having played in minor leagues, from ten years is the general director of A.S. Cittadella in Serie B.

1963 births
Living people
Italian footballers
Calcio Padova players
Association football forwards